Junior B may refer to:

Junior ice hockey leagues in Canada:
Calgary Junior Hockey League
Capital Junior Hockey League, in Alberta
Capitale Junior AA Hockey League, in Quebec
Central Junior B Hockey League of the Ontario Junior Hockey League
Chaudiere-Appalaches Junior AA Hockey League, in Quebec
Eastern Ontario Junior Hockey League
Estrie-Mauricie Junior AA Hockey League, in Quebec
Greater Ontario Junior Hockey League
Heritage Junior B Hockey League in Alberta
Island Junior Hockey League, in Prince Edward Island
Keystone Junior Hockey League, in Manitoba
Kootenay International Junior Hockey League, in British Columbia
Laurentides-Lanaudière Junior AA Hockey League, in Quebec
Ligue de Hockey Junior AA Lac St-Louis, in Quebec
Ligue de Hockey Junior AA Saguenay-Lac-St-Jean, in Quebec
Métropolitaine Junior AA Hockey League, in Quebec
New Brunswick Junior B Hockey League
North Eastern Alberta Junior B Hockey League
North West Junior Hockey League, in Alberta and British Columbia
Nova Scotia Junior B Hockey League of the  Nova Scotia Junior Hockey League
Pacific Junior Hockey League, in British Columbia
Prairie Junior Hockey League, in Saskatchewan
St. John's Junior Hockey League, in Newfoundland and Labrador
Thunder Bay Junior B Hockey League
Vancouver Island Junior Hockey League, in British Columbia
Western Junior B of the Western Ontario Hockey League
Defunct junior ice hockey leagues in Canada
Border Cities Junior B Hockey League, a hockey league that operated in Ontario from 1958 to 1964
Eastern Junior B Hockey League, a hockey league in eastern Ontario
Golden Horseshoe Junior B of the Golden Horseshoe Junior Hockey League
International Junior B Hockey League, which operated in northern Ontario and northern Michigan in the United States
Metro Junior B Hockey League, predecessor of the Metro Junior A Hockey League
Mid-Ontario Junior B Hockey League in southern Ontario
Mid-Western Junior Hockey League, previously known as the Southwestern Junior B Hockey League (1973–1974) and the Waterloo-Wellington Junior B Hockey League 1974–1977
Niagara District Junior B Hockey League, that operated from 1956 to 1979
North of Superior Junior B Hockey League
North Saskatchewan Junior B Hockey League
Western Junior B Hockey League; see Western Ontario Hockey League
Ontario Junior B Lacrosse League